Clinteria coerulea is a species of flower scarab endemic to southern India. It is known from the plains of Tamil Nadu.

Males have a more slender fore tibia.

References 

Cetoniinae